The Wallis WA-120 is an experimental British autogyro developed by Ken Wallis.

Design and development
Following on from his family of single-seat autogyros former Royal Air Force aviator Wing Commander Ken Wallis developed a high-performance long-range variant with an enclosed cockpit. The WA-120, registered G-AYVO, was first flown on 13 June 1971. The autogyro is powered by a  Rolls-Royce Continental O-240-A piston engine driving a four-bladed pusher propeller.

Specification

See also

References

Notes

Bibliography

1970s British civil utility aircraft
Single-engined pusher autogyros
Aircraft first flown in 1971